FB Líneas Aéreas S.A., operating as Flybondi, is a low-cost airline in Argentina. The airline, the first of its kind in the country, operates Boeing 737-800 aircraft, with bases in Buenos Aires and Córdoba. All aircraft are registered in Argentina. The airline's inaugural flight from Córdoba's Ingeniero Aeronáutico Ambrosio L.V. Taravella International Airport to Puerto Iguazú's Cataratas del Iguazú International Airport took place on 26 January 2018.  The company slogan is La libertad de volar, meaning "The freedom of flying" in Spanish.

Destinations

The first routes were launched from its base at Córdoba International Airport in January 2018, to the cities of Mendoza, Bariloche and Puerto Iguazú. In February 2018, the airline was the first civilian airline to operate from El Palomar Airport near Buenos Aires, where it established a new base and began flights to Salta, Neuquén, Tucumán, .

Flybondi went international on December 17, 2018, with flights between El Palomar in the Greater Buenos Aires area and the Paraguayan capital Asunción.

In July, 2019, the airline announced that it will start flights between Buenos Aires and Rio de Janeiro. The flights started operating from 11 October 2019, going from the airline's main base at Buenos Aires' El Palomar Airport to Galeão Airport in Rio de Janeiro.

Fleet

, Flybondi operates the following aircraft:

References

External links
 Official Flybondi Website

Airlines of Argentina
Airlines established in 2016
Low-cost carriers
Argentine companies established in 2016